The 1924 season was the thirteenth season for Santos FC.

References

External links
Official Site 

Santos
1924
1924 in Brazilian football